46th Street & Minnehaha is a bus rapid transit station on the Metro A Line in Minneapolis, Minnesota.

The station is located at the intersection of Minnehaha Avenue on 46th Street. Both station platforms are located west of Minnehaha Avenue.

The station opened June 11, 2016 with the rest of the A Line.

Bus connections
 Route 7 - Plymouth Avenue - 27th Avenue - Minnehaha Avenue - 46th Street Station - 34th Avenue
 Route 9 - Glenwood Avenue - Wayzata Boulevard - Cedar Lake Road - 46th Street Station
 Route 46 - 50th Street - 46th Street - 46th Street Station - Highland Village
 Route 74 - 46th Street Station - Randolph Avenue - West 7th Street - East 7th Street - Sunray Transit Center
Northbound connections to local bus Routes 7 and 9 can be made on Minnehaha Avenue. Local Routes 46, 74, and eastbound Routes 7 and 9 share platforms with the A Line.

Notable places nearby
Minnehaha Mile
Hiawatha, Minneapolis

References

External links 
 Metro Transit: 46th Street & Minnehaha Station

Bus stations in Minnesota
2016 establishments in Minnesota